The Amazing Panda Adventure is a 1995 American adventure film directed by Christopher Cain and starring Stephen Lang, Yi Ding, and Ryan Slater. It follows a 10-year-old American boy (played by Slater) who travels to China and has to take a panda cub to the reserve so it can reunite with its mother. The film was produced and distributed by Warner Bros. under their Family Entertainment label on August 25, 1995, and was preceded by the Looney Tunes short Carrotblanca in theaters.

Plot 
Ryan Tyler's father Michael sends him a plane ticket so that he can visit him in China, where he works with pandas. Ryan is not sure he wants to go, but his mother says he can just come back if he doesn't like it.

In China, Michael and his two companions, Ling, a young girl and champion translator, and Chu, Ling's grandfather who is very experienced with pandas track down a mother panda and place a radio collar on her. After they leave, she steps into a trap. Back at the reserve, Michael and the staff recognize from the radio signal that the panda is in danger. Just as Michael, Ling and Chu set out to visit the panda, Ryan arrives at the reserve. After some argument, Michael lets him come.

The poachers who set up the trap, Shong and Po, shoot Michael in the ankle, and flee with the panda's cub. Michael and the mother panda are returned to the reserve by helicopter, and Ling, Chu, and Ryan look for the poachers. They eventually discover their hideout, and free the panda cub before Chu lets Ryan and Ling travel on their own because he has to return to the reserve.

The poachers shoot the bridge that Ryan and Ling are crossing, and the two of them and the panda cub are washed downstream, but manage to make it to the surface. The second time they are washed downstream, the pair realize that they are covered in leeches upon resurfacing and are forced to remove all their clothing and wash themselves off in the lake. Ryan realizes that he can use the batteries in his watch to power the radio collar and enable his father to locate them.

Attempting to make their way back to the reserve with the cub, they come upon a local village that grants them hospitality for protecting the cub. However, Shong and Po have also arrived. The villagers help the trio escape, but the poachers follow. Michael arrives and subdues the poachers, and he, Ryan, Ling, and the cub drive back to the reserve. The Chinese officials who were going to close the reserve see Ryan returning the cub and the cub reuniting with its mother and decide to let it remain open.

Cast

Reception 
On review aggregator website Rotten Tomatoes, the film holds an approval rating of 27% based on 11 reviews, and an average rating of 4.5/10.

Yi Ding was nominated for Best Young Supporting Actress in the 17th Youth in Film Awards for her performance as 'Ling' in the film.

See also 
 List of American films of 1995

References

External links 

 
 

1995 films
1990s adventure films
American adventure films
American children's films
1990s English-language films
Chinese-language films
Films set in China
Films shot in China
Films shot in Vancouver
Films about giant pandas
Films directed by Christopher Cain
Films scored by William Ross
Warner Bros. films
1990s American films